I Prefer the Sound of the Sea is a 2000 Italian-French drama film directed by Mimmo Calopresti. It was screened in the Un Certain Regard section at the 2000 Cannes Film Festival.

The title Preferisco il rumore del mare is a verse of Dino Campana. Rosario reads excerpts of Heart and works in a bookshop named Franti.

Cast
 Silvio Orlando - Luigi
 Michele Raso - Rosario
 Fabrizia Sacchi - Serena
 Paolo Cirio - Matteo
 Mimmo Calopresti - Don Lorenzo
 Andrea Occhipinti - Massimo
 Enrica Rosso - Elisabetta
 Marcello Mazzarella - Vincenzo
 Eugenio Masciari - Cappabianca
 Raffaella Lebboroni - Miriam
 Palma Valentina Di Nunno - Adele
 Lorenzo Ventavoli - Umberto
 Concettina Luddeni - Madre di Luigi
 Laura Curino - Maria (governante)
 Antonio Ferrante - Pasquale (padre di Rosario)
 Stefano Venturi - Giovanni (Mr. Pleigin)
 Giovanni Bissaca - Magistrato
 Elena Turra - Segretaria di Luigi

References

External links

2000 films
2000 drama films
Italian drama films
French drama films
2000s Italian-language films
Films directed by Mimmo Calopresti
2000s French films
2000s Italian films